Halambage Premasiri, also known as H.G. Premasiri (24 February 1964 – 12 August 2016) was a Sri Lankan first-class cricketer, entrepreneur and  president of the Galle District Cricket Association. He was shot dead near his residence in Ambalangoda while he was the president of the Galle District Cricket Association. His murder remains unsolved.

Biography 
Premasiri was born on 24 February 1964 in Colombo. He studied at the Dharmasoka College in Ambalangoda.

Career 
Halambage played 70 first-class cricket matches and 5 List A matches for Ruhuna and Bloomfield Cricket and Athletic Club.

Administrator

Controversial appointment 
On 28 July 2016, Halambage Premasiri was appointed as the president of the Galle District Cricket Association after being secretary of the association for some time. The appointment came during a period of turmoil in the Association. Sri Lanka Cricket disagreed with the appointment and ordered fresh elections for 27 August 2018.

Possible links with pitch fixing 
While serving as the President of the Galle District Cricket Association he was reported to have connections with the Galle pitch fixing scandal, according to Al Jazeera.

Murder 
On 12 August 2016, Halambage Premasiri was murdered by two individuals in a white motor car near his residence in the Manimulla area in Ambalangoda. He was shot dead by the unknown suspects while he was driving home with his 12-year-old son.

Reports suggested that his controversial appointment and the legal dispute over the elections may have been factors in the murder. He was killed just after the conclusion of the 2nd Test match between Sri Lanka and Australia in Galle which was organised by the Galle Cricket Association.

References

External links 
 
 

1964 births
2016 deaths
Sri Lankan cricketers
Sinhalese businesspeople
Sri Lankan murder victims
People murdered in Sri Lanka
Ruhuna cricketers
Bloomfield Cricket and Athletic Club cricketers
Singha Sports Club cricketers
Cricketers from Colombo